American World Patriarchs is a Christian religious organization established in 1967.

Founding
The group was founded by Uladyslau Ryzhy-Ryzhski, a priest from Belarus who had been consecrated as bishop of Laconia, New Hampshire and the states of New England by the American Orthodox Catholic Church. He was later raised to the position of archbishop by the Old Orthodox Catholic Patriarchate of America. It was largely through Ryzhy-Ryzhski's elevations of other independent bishops to the level of patriarch that the new organization was formed.

Ryzhy-Ryzhski
Ryzhy-Ryzhski did not require that any of the individuals he elevated to the patriarchate recognize his authority or jurisdiction over any of them. He began to create new archbishop-patriarchs for each national and ethnic group, at the same time creating a church hierarchy of international scope. After his excommunication from the American Orthodox Catholic Church, Ryzhy-Ryzhski worked harder to develop his new group, and established patriarchates for Canada, Hungary, West Germany, Puerto Rico, Colombia, Haiti, Santo Domingo, Brazil, Peru, Argentina, El Salvador, Nigeria, the West Indies, Norway, Sweden, Formosa, and Ukraine.

He went on to create the Peoples University of the Americas in conjunction with the AWP. In addition to the religious training it offers, the University offers a variety of courses in the humanities in New York for ethnic and immigrant groups, with particular emphasis on English as a second language.

Current leadership
On his death in 1978, Ryzhy-Ryzhski was succeeded by his brother, Archbishop Emigidius J. Ryzhy, as the Apostolic Administrator of All American World Patriarchs. Ryzhy is assisted by Archbishop Adam Bilecky, Patriarch II of the American World Patriarchate, Archbishop Peter A. Zurawetsky, Archbishop Frank Barquera, and Bishop Piotr Huszcza.

Membership and structure
In 1997, the church reported 19,457 members, seventeen congregations, and fifty-four priests in the United States. One additional congregation with three priests was reported in Canada, with work affiliated with the church reported as taking place in seventeen additional countries. The most recent reported congregation was established in 1993 in Belarus. This new congregation, heading by Bishop Huszcza with six assisting priests in Minsk, Lida, and Siomki Goradok, was reported as having a membership of thirty-five thousand and continuing to grow.

References
 Lewis, James R. The Encyclopedia of Cults, Sects, and New Religions. Amherst, NY: Prometheus Books, 1998. .

Christian organizations established in 1967
Independent Eastern Orthodox denominations
Christian organizations established in the 20th century